The State Pariyatti Sasana University, Mandalay is a Buddhist university located in Mandalay, Myanmar, which teaches members of the Buddhist sangha, specifically in the Pitaka, Pali, Burmese language and Burmese literature, and missionary work. The university was opened on 21 August 1986. The university offers Bachelor of Arts (Sāsanatakkasīla Dhammācariya), Master of Arts (Sāsanatakkasīla Mahādhammācariya) and Ph.D (Sāsanatakkasīla Dhammapāragū) degrees, which are conferred as Burmese Buddhist titles. In 2018, 51 titles were conferred to Buddhist monks.

References

External websites 
 Official website

Universities and colleges in Mandalay
Seminaries and theological colleges in Myanmar
Buddhist universities and colleges in Myanmar
Educational institutions established in 1996
1996 establishments in Myanmar